Néjib Limam (born 12 June 1953) is a Tunisian former professional footballer who played as a forward. He played for Tunisia in the 1978 FIFA World Cup. He also played for Stade Tunisien.

Club Stats

Notes

References

External links
FIFA profile

1953 births
Living people
Tunisian footballers
Association football forwards
Tunisia international footballers
1978 African Cup of Nations players
1978 FIFA World Cup players
Competitors at the 1975 Mediterranean Games
Mediterranean Games bronze medalists for Tunisia
Mediterranean Games medalists in football
Saudi Professional League players
Stade Tunisien players
Al Hilal SFC players